KSLC (90.3 FM) is a classical music radio station in McMinnville, Oregon. It is broadcast over the air at 90.3 MHz and on the internet using the Live365 player.

KSLC broadcasts in HD.

On April 2, 2020 at 7 am, KSLC switched to a simulcast of classical-formatted KQAC 89.9 FM Portland and to ICAN-children's arts on its HD2 subchannel.

Effective November 19, 2020, Linfield University donated the station to All Classical Public Media, Inc.

See also
List of community radio stations in the United States

Previous logo

References

External links

SLC
McMinnville, Oregon
1972 establishments in Oregon
Classical music radio stations in the United States
Children's radio stations in the United States